The 2010 Tippeligaen was the 66th completed season of top division football in Norway. The competition began on 14 March and ended on 7 November. Rosenborg was the defending champions, having secured their twenty-first league championship in 2009. Haugesund, Hønefoss and Kongsvinger entered as the three promoted teams from the 2009 1. divisjon. They replaced Fredrikstad, Bodø/Glimt and Lyn who were relegated to the 2010 1. divisjon.

Season summary 
On 6 June, Lillestrøm scored three goals in four minutes and 24 seconds, two of them in injury time, to go from 3–0 down to 3–3 away at Molde. Sandefjord lost 5-0 away to Odd Grenland on 26 September. This was their 23rd consecutive top flight match without winning, breaking a record of 22 set by Os in 1975. The streak would continue for four matches, ending at 27 before Sandefjord won in their 28th attempt on the last day of the season, beating Hønefoss 6–1 at home. On 31 October, Rosenborg played Kongsvinger to a 0–0 draw away, making 2010 the second consecutive season without away losses for Rosenborg.

Kongsvinger and Sandefjord were relegated at the end of the 2010 Tippeligaen season after finishing in the bottom two places of the league table. Sandefjord ended a two-year tenure at the highest football level of Norway, while Kongsvinger returned to the 1. divisjon after just one season. They were replaced by 2010 1. divisjon champions Sogndal and runners-up Sarpsborg 08. Sogndal returned to the Tippeligaen after a six-year hiatus, while Sarpsborg 08 made its debut at the Norwegian top-level league.

Hønefoss as 14th-placed Tippeligaen team had to compete in a relegation/promotion playoff with the 1. divisjon teams ranked third through fifth (Fredrikstad, Løv-Ham and Ranheim) for one spot in the 2011 Tippeligaen. This spot was taken by Fredrikstad, who defeated Hønefoss 8–1 on aggregate in the playoff finals and returned to Norway's top flight after just one season. In turn, Hønefoss had to return to the 1. divisjon, also after just one season.

Teams 
Haugesund and Hønefoss were promoted directly from the 1. divisjon at the end of the 2009 season. Kongsvinger defeated Sarpsborg by 5–4 on aggregate in the final matches of the play-off round between the 3rd-, 4th- and 5th-placed team in the 1. divisjon and the 14th-placed team in the Tippeligaen, giving them the sixteenth and final spot.

Team summaries

1Stabæk also played three home matches in May at Ullevaal Stadion because Telenor Arena was being used to host the Eurovision Song Contest 2010.

Managerial changes

League table

Positions by round

Relegation play-offs 

At the end of the season, Sandefjord and Kongsvinger were relegated directly to 1. divisjon, and were replaced by Sogndal and Sarpsborg who were directly promoted.

Four teams entered a play-off for the last Tippeligaen spot in the 2011 season. These were:
 A) Hønefoss (by virtue of being the 14th placed team in the Tippeligaen)
 B) Fredrikstad (by virtue of being the third placed team in the 1. divisjon)
 C) Løv-Ham (by virtue of being the fourth placed team in the 1. divisjon)
 D) Ranheim (by virtue of being the fifth placed team in the 1. divisjon)

Results

Season statistics

Top scorers

Source: NRK Sport

Top assists

Source: Alt om fotball

Discipline

Player
Most yellow cards: 9
 Kristján Örn Sigurðsson (Hønefoss)
Most red cards: 1
23 players

Club
Most yellow cards: 47
Brann

Most red cards: 3
Molde
Vålerenga

Attendances

Awards

Annual awards

Goalkeeper of the Year 
The Goalkeeper of the Year awarded to  Anders Lindegaard (Aalesunds)

Defender of the Year 

The Defender of the Year awarded to  Tom Høgli (Tromsø)

Midfielder of the Year  
The Midfielder of the Year awarded to  Anthony Annan (Rosenborg)

Striker of the Year 

The Striker of the Year awarded to  Mohammed Abdellaoue (Vålerenga)

Coach of the Year 

The Coach of the Year awarded to  Jostein Grindhaug (Haugesund)

References 

Eliteserien seasons
1
Norway
Norway